The Ottawa Safety Council (OSC) is a non-profit charity based in Ottawa, Canada established in 1957 that promotes safety and protection of individuals. The OSC has a children's safety program, promotes adult crossing guards, and runs a motorcycle rider course.

External links
Official site
Motorcycle course website

References

Safety Council
Charities based in Canada
Organizations established in 1957